Phillimore Street is a street in Fremantle, Western Australia; it runs between Queen Street, outside the Fremantle railway station and Cliff Street.

It is the location of a precinct of archaeological interest as well as being located in the Fremantle West End Heritage area.

The street includes several heritage buildings:
 Falk & Company Warehouse, between Henry and Pakenham Streets, constructed in 1888.
 Fremantle Chamber of Commerce, built in 1912.
 Fremantle Customs House, corner of Cliff Street, built in 1908.
 Fremantle Fire Station, built in 1909.
 Fremantle railway station, built in 1907.
 Howard Smith Building, corner of Mouat Street, built in 1900.
 P&O Building, built in 1903.
 Robert Harper Building, built in 1890
 Wilhelmsen House, corner of Cliff Street, built in 1902.

References

 
Streets in Fremantle